The Siamese green-eyed gecko (Gekko siamensis) is a species of lizard in the family Gekkonidae. The species is endemic to Thailand.

Etymology
The specific name siamensis refers to the type locality. The specific name of the now-synonymized Gekko taylori honors Edward Harrison Taylor, an American herpetologist.

Habitat
The preferred natural habitat of G. siamensis is forest.

Reproduction
G. siamensis is oviparous.

References

Further reading
Grossmann, Wolfgang; Ulber, Thomas (1990). "Ein neuer Gecko aus Zentral-Thailand: Gekko siamensis sp. nov. (Reptilia: Sauria: Gekkonidae)". Sauria 12 (3): 9–18. (Gekko siamensis, new species). (in German, with an abstract in English).
Rösler H (1995). Geckos der Welt – Alle Gattungen. Leipzig: Urania. 256 pp. (Gekko siamensis, p. 121). (in German).
Rösler H (2000). "Kommentierte Liste der rezent, subrezent und fossil bekannten Geckotaxa (Reptilia: Gekkonomorpha)". Gekkota 2: 28–153. (Gekko siamensis, p. 82). (in German).

Gekko
Reptiles described in 1990
Endemic fauna of Thailand
Geckos of Thailand